Waldemar Podolski (born 4 April 1955) is a Polish former footballer.

Podolski played for two years in the Polish highest division and twelve years in the second division. One of the teams he played for would go to camps three times a year, where they would hike in the snow and never see a football.

He is the father of Poland-born German former international Lukas Podolski.

References

External links
 Waldemar Podolski at 90minut.pl

Polish footballers
Polish emigrants to Germany
Polish people of German descent
Silesian-German people
Association football forwards
1955 births
Living people
Szombierki Bytom players